The 12th Hong Kong Awards ceremony, honored the best films of 1992 and took place on 23 April 1993 at Hong Kong Academy for Performing Arts, Wan Chai, Hong Kong. The ceremony was hosted by Lydia Shum and John Sham, during the ceremony awards are presented in 16 categories.

Awards
Winners are listed first, highlighted in boldface, and indicated with a double dagger.

The Special Commemoration Award was a special award presented in memoriam of actor Cho-Fan Ng

References

External links
Official website of the Hong Kong Film Awards

1993
1992 film awards
1993 in Hong Kong